The Outrigger is a style of Apple Macintosh desktop computer case designed for easy access. Outrigger cases were used on the Power Macintosh 7200, 7300, 7500, 7600 and Power Macintosh G3 Desktop computers from August 1995 to December 1998.

The logic board is mounted at the bottom of the case, with drive bays and a power supply in a separate fold-out section that swings aside as one piece and props open. This allows unfettered access to logic board connections such as the memory, Central processing unit, VRAM and drive/power connections without a screwdriver. The PCI slots were located on the left edge of the case and covered only by a plastic shield, making them accessible without lifting the drive bay assembly.

Apple's next Power Macintosh case design as used in the Power Macintosh G3 (Blue & White) would also provide easy user access (although the motherboard and power-supply were significantly more difficult to replace by the layman).

References

Macintosh case designs